Sir Robert Thorburn (March 28, 1836 – April 12, 1906) was a British-born Newfoundland merchant and politician who served as the colony's Premier from 1885 to 1889.

Life 
Born in Scotland, Thorburn emigrated to Newfoundland in 1852 when he was sixteen. From 1870 to 1885 and again from 1893 to 1906 he was a member of the colony's appointed Legislative Council, the Upper House of Newfoundland's parliament.

Thorburn was an opponent of Sir William Whiteway's plans to build a cross-Newfoundland railway as a means of diversifying and industrialising the economy. Thorburn, a leading  merchant, argued that the colony should be developed along strict commercial lines based on the fisheries.

Traditionally, Newfoundland politics had been divided along sectarian lines with Catholics supporting the Liberals and Protestants supporting the Conservative Party of Newfoundland. Whiteway, however, who had been elected as a Conservative with the support of Protestants had lost the support of much of the business community with his support of the railway over the fishery and reached out to the Catholic Liberals  In order to stay in power creating a cross denominational coalition.

Thorburn created the New Party to represent the interest of St. John's businessmen.

The Harbour Grace Affray, an 1883 sectarian melee between Irish Catholics of Riverhead and the Southside of Harbour Grace who confronted a parade of  Orangemen. The resulting battle killed five and wounded seventeen. The riot strained relations between Catholics and Protestants and led to the collapse of Whiteway's government when Protestants deserted it.

The religious violence gave Thorburn an opportunity. He joined with Orangemen and Protestants who had deserted Whiteway's government in the wake of the riot  to create a new party, the Reform Party as a Protestant Rights organization and swept to power in the 1885 election making Thorburn the new premier.

In power, Thorburn's government turned away from the sectarian agenda that had brought it to power and implemented Thorburn's real agenda, the rejection of the railway plan and focussing on developing the economy along the fishers. An economic downturn was exacerbated by the colony's one industry economy  forcing Thorburn to belatedly reverse himself and implement a public works agenda. It was too late, however, and Thorburn was defeated in 1889 by Whiteway and his new Liberal Party which had been created to promote the railway plan. The Reform Party collapsed and a new Tory Party emerged from its ashes but was only able to hold power twice for brief periods before disappearing.

References
 

1836 births
1906 deaths
Premiers of Newfoundland Colony
Members of the Legislative Council of Newfoundland